Abtavil (also Romanized as Ābţavīl and Āb Ţavīl; also known as Abū Ţavīl) is a village in Howmeh Rural District, in the Central District of Bushehr County, Bushehr Province, Iran. At the 2006 census, its population was 1,463, in 329 families.

References 

Populated places in Bushehr County